Susanne Schultz Nielsson (born 8 July 1960 in Århus) is a former swimmer from Denmark, who won the bronze medal in the women's 100 metres breaststroke competition at the 1980 Summer Olympics in Moscow. She represented the club AGF Aarhus.

External links
Sports-Reference profile

References

1960 births
Living people
Olympic swimmers of Denmark
Olympic bronze medalists for Denmark
Swimmers at the 1980 Summer Olympics
Sportspeople from Aarhus
Olympic bronze medalists in swimming
Medalists at the 1980 Summer Olympics
Danish female breaststroke swimmers